The elections to Moray Council were held on Thursday 4 May 2017, on the same day as the 31 other local authorities in Scotland. It was the third successive Local Council election to run under the STV Electoral System. The election used the eight wards created under the Local Governance (Scotland) Act 2004, with 26 Councillors being elected. Each ward elected either 3 or 4 members, using the STV electoral system.

Following the 2017 election, a Conservative-Independent administration was formed. George Alexander (Independent) was appointed Leader of the council, while James Allan (Conservative) was appointed Convenor of the council.

In May 2018, all but one of the Conservative councillors left the administration, leaving the independents and Convenor James Allan in a minority administration. Following negotiations with other groups, the SNP formed a minority administration in June 2018, with Graham Leadbitter taking on the role of Council Leader and Shona Morrison being appointed Convenor, the first women to take on the role in Moray Council's history.

Summary of results

Note: "Votes" are the first preference votes. The net gain/loss and percentage changes relate to the result of the previous Scottish local elections in 2012. This may differ from other published sources showing gain/loss relative to seats held at dissolution of Scotland's councils.

Ward results

Speyside Glenlivet
2012: 2 X SNP &  1 X Independent
2017: 1 X SNP, 1 X Conservative & 1 X Independent
2012-2017: Conservative gain one seat from SNP

Keith & Cullen
2012: 2 X Independent & 1 X SNP
2017: 1 X SNP, 1 X Conservative & 1 X Independent
2012-2017: Conservative gain one seat from Independent

Buckie
2012: 2 X Independent & 1 X SNP
2017: 1 X SNP, 1 X Conservative & 1 X Independent
2012-2017: Conservative gain one seat from Independent

Fochabers Lhanbryde
2012: 1 X SNP, 1 X Conservative & 1 X Labour
2017: 2 X SNP & 1 X Conservative
2012-2017: SNP gain one seat from Labour

Heldon & Laich
2012: 2 X Independent, 1 X SNP & 1 X Conservative 
2017: 2 X Independent, 1 X SNP & 1 X Conservative
2012-2017: No change

Elgin City North
2012: 2 X SNP & 1 X Labour
2017: 1 X SNP, 1 X Conservative & 1 X Independent
2012-2017: Conservative & Independent each gain one seat from SNP & Labour

Elgin City South
2012: 1 X SNP, 1 X Conservative & 1 X Labour
2017: 1 X SNP, 1 X Conservative & 1 X Labour 
2012-2017: No change

Forres
2012: 3 X Independent & 1 X SNP
2017: 2 X Independent, 1 X SNP & 1 X Conservative
2012-2017: Conservative gain from Independent

Changes since 2017
† On 10 May 2017, Elgin City North Independent Cllr Sandy Cooper resigned his seat less than a week after being elected in the 2017 elections. A by-election took place on 13 July 2017. The seat was won by Conservative candidate, Maria Mclean.
†† On 21 October 2017, Speyside Glenlivet Conservative Cllr Walter Wilson resigned from the party group following disagreements with colleagues in the party group. He now sits as an Independent.
††† On 24 October 2019 Keith and Cullen Independent Cllr Ron Shepherd retired due to ill-health. A by-election was held on 21 November 2019 and it was won by the Conservative's Laura Powell.

By-elections since 2017

References

External links
of Candidates Council candidates 2017

2017
2017 Scottish local elections
21st century in Moray